White sponge nevus (WSN) is an autosomal dominant condition of the oral mucosa (the mucous membrane lining of the mouth). It is caused by a mutations in certain genes coding for keratin, which causes a defect in the normal process of keratinization of the mucosa. This results in lesions which are thick, white and velvety on the inside of the cheeks within the mouth. Usually, these lesions are present from birth or develop during childhood. The condition is entirely harmless, and no treatment is required.

Signs and symptoms
It presents itself in the mouth, most frequently as a thick, bilateral, symmetrical white plaques with a spongy, corrugated or velvety texture. Most usually, the lesions are on the buccal mucosa, but sometimes on the labial mucosa, alveolar ridge, floor of the mouth, ventral surface of the tongue or soft palate. The gingival margin and dorsum of the tongue are almost never affected. Less commonly, sites outside the mouth are affected, including the nasal, esophageal, laryngeal, anal and genital mucosae. It usually is present from birth, or develops during childhood. Rarely, the lesions may develop during adolescence. Apart from the appearance of the affected areas, there are usually no other signs or symptoms.

Pathophysiology

WSN is caused by a mutation of the keratin 4 or keratin 13 genes, located respectively at human chromosomes 12q13 and 17q21-q22. The condition is inherited in an autosomal dominant manner. This indicates that the defective gene responsible for a disorder is located on an autosome (chromosomes 12 and 17 are autosomes), and only one copy of the defective gene is sufficient to cause the disorder, when inherited from a parent who has the disorder.

Diagnosis

Differential diagnosis
It is often mistaken for leukoplakia.

Classification
The ICD-10 lists WSN under "other congenital malformations of mouth". It could be classified as a skin condition, or more precisely as a genodermatosis (a genetically determined skin disorder).

Treatment
There is no treatment, but because this is a benign condition with no serious clinical complications, prognosis is excellent.

See also 
 Oral melanosis
 List of cutaneous conditions caused by mutations in keratins
 Hereditary benign intraepithelial dyskeratosis

References

External links 
 

Conditions of the mucous membranes
Oral neoplasia
Autosomal dominant disorders
Rare diseases
Cytoskeletal defects